

Ján Hollý (contemporary orthography: Gán Hollí; 24 March 1785, Bur-Szent-Miklos – 14 April 1849, Jókő) was a Slovak poet and translator. He was the first greater Slovak poet to write exclusively in the newly standardized literary Slovak language.  His predecessors mostly wrote in various regional versions of Czech, Slovakized Czech or Latin. Hollý translated Virgil's Aeneid and wrote his own epic poetry in alexandrine verse to show that the Slovak language recently standardized by Anton Bernolák was capable of expressing complex poetic forms.

Life 
Hollý studied in Skalica (Szakolca), Pressburg (Pozsony) and Trnava (Nagyszombat). He was a Catholic priest at Madunice (Madunicz) near Piešťany (Pöstyén), where he wrote all his major works sitting below a big tree. Hollý was an active member of the Slovak national revival movement. He used the topic of Great-Moravian ruler Svätopluk to encourage the nation, and is regarded as the founding father of Slovak poetry.

Major works 
Svatopluk
Cyrilo-Metodiáda
Sláv

See also
History of the Slovak language

External links

References

1785 births
1849 deaths
People from Senica District
Slovak Roman Catholic priests
Slovak poets
Catholic poets
Slovak translators
19th-century Austrian Roman Catholic priests
Translators of Virgil